Dead Awake may refer to:

 Dead Awake (2001 film)
 Dead Awake (2010 film)
 Dead Awake (2016 film), an American supernatural psychological horror film

See also
 When We Dead Awaken, an 1899 play by Norwegian dramatist Henrik Ibsen